The Five-Legged Sheep is a 1954 French comedy film directed by Henri Verneuil. It won the Golden Leopard at the Locarno International Film Festival and was nominated for the Academy Award for Best Story. It's considered a classic of French post-war cinema.

Plot

An old farmer whose five sons are quintuplets has hated them for over 20 years. After a visit from the villagers, they become convinced that the brothers should be reunited, and a search for the five brothers starts.

Cast 
Fernandel as Édouard Saint-Forget / Les quintuplés : Alain, Bernard, Charles, Désiré, Etienne
Françoise Arnoul as Marianne Durand-Perrin
Andrex as Un marin
Édouard Delmont as Le docteur Bollène
Georges Chamarat as M. Durand-Perrin, le père
Paulette Dubost as Solange
Louis de Funès as Pilate
René Génin as Le maire
Denise Grey as Mme Durand-Perrin, la mère
Tony Jacquot as L'instituteur
Ky Duyen as Un chinois
Darío Moreno as Un matelot américain
Noël Roquevert as Antoine Brissard
Lolita López as Azitad
Michel Ardan as Un marin
Edmond Ardisson as Le brigadier
Manuel Gary as Le docteur
René Havard as Le liftier
Yette Lucas as Mariette
Albert Michel as Le patron du bistrot
Gil Delamare as Le chauffard
Leopoldo Francés as Le métis
Nina Myral as La bonne
Yannick Malloire as Une petite fille
Raphaël Patorni as Rodrigue
Max Desrau as Le nouveau patron des pompes funèbres
Jocelyne Bressy
Micheline Gary as L'hôtesse de l'instutut de beauté

References

External links

1954 films
French black-and-white films
French comedy films
Films directed by Henri Verneuil
Golden Leopard winners
Quintuplets
1954 comedy films
1950s French films